Cameron Carr,   is an Australian Paralympic wheelchair rugby player.  He has won a silver medal at the 2008 Paralympics and gold medals at the 2012  and 2016 Paralympics.

Biography 

Cameron Michael Carr was born on 13 August 1977, and lives in Brisbane, Queensland. His father is Norm Carr, Queensland rugby league State of Origin representative. At 19 years old, Carr just signed a contract with the Sydney Roosters. The weekend before moving to Sydney, Carr was involved in a motor vehicle collision when a friend driving him home from a 21st birthday fell asleep at the wheel. His neck was broken as a result of the crash.

He first competed in wheelchair rugby in 2003 and was selected for Australia in 2005. He won a silver medal at the 2008 Beijing Paralympics and a gold medal at the 2012 London Paralympics. He was a member of the Steelers team that won silver medal at the 2010 World Wheelchair Rugby Championships in Vancouver and a gold medal at the 2014 World Championships in Odense, and the team that retained its gold medal at the 2016 Rio Paralympics after defeating the United States 59–58 in the final.

Carr was awarded an Order of Australia Medal  in the 2014 Australia Day Honours "for service to sport as a Gold Medallist at the London 2012 Paralympic Games."

Carr is married with three children; one son and two twin daughters.

References

External links

Australian wheelchair rugby players
Paralympic wheelchair rugby players of Australia
Wheelchair rugby players at the 2008 Summer Paralympics
Wheelchair rugby players at the 2012 Summer Paralympics
Wheelchair rugby players at the 2016 Summer Paralympics
Paralympic gold medalists for Australia
Paralympic silver medalists for Australia
Living people
1977 births
Recipients of the Medal of the Order of Australia
Medalists at the 2008 Summer Paralympics
Medalists at the 2012 Summer Paralympics
Medalists at the 2016 Summer Paralympics
Paralympic medalists in wheelchair rugby
People from Redland City